Arnau de Palomar was the first lord of Riudoms, in Southern Catalonia near the current city of Reus. The lordship of Riudoms was granted to Arnau de Palomar 24 January 1150 by the lord of the City and Land of Tarragona, Robert Bordet (known as Robert d'Aguiló).

12th-century Catalan people
Year of birth unknown
Year of death unknown
Medieval Catalan nobility